La Marie du port (Marie of the Port) is a 1950 French romantic drama film directed by Marcel Carné. The screenplay was written by Georges Ribemont-Dessaignes and Jacques Prévert, based on a novel by Georges Simenon. The music score is by Joseph Kosma and the cinematography by Henri Alekan. It was filmed on location in Cherbourg, Normandy, France.

Plot
Henri, owner of a busy brasserie and cinema in Cherbourg, takes the easy-going Odile who lives with him to the funeral of her father in Port-en-Bessin. The two are bored with each other. He waits for her in a café where he is taken with a new waitress called Marie, unaware that she is Odile's tough little sister. He buys an old trawler in Port-en-Bessin, which he visits often to oversee its restoration and to pursue Marie. She has a young admirer called Marcel who gets drunk and is knocked down by Henri's car. Henri takes the lad to his apartment in Cherbourg, where Odile can look after him. One day the provocative Marie turns up at Cherbourg, tantalising Henri but not giving in. Tired of trying to seduce her, he takes her to Marcel's room, where they find Odile in bed with him. Disgusted with all three, Marie gets a bus home. A phone call from there about his boat warns Henri that Marie has been threatening to throw herself into the sea. He drives over in haste and she tells him she can in fact swim like a fish. As a last effort at winning her, he slips the keys to his business into her victorious hand.

Background
The contemporary US-American version was significantly edited and is noticeably shorter.

Cast
Jean Gabin as Henri Chatelard 
Blanchette Brunoy as Odile Le Flem 
Nicole Courcel as Marie Le Flem  
René Blancard as Dorchain  
Odette Laure as Françoise 
Jane Marken as Madame Josselin, café owner
Julien Carette as Thomas Viau
Claude Romain as Marcel Viaud
Louis Seigner as Jules
Robert Vattier
 Joël Hamond
 Georges Vitray 
 Georges Galley 
 Olivier Hussenot 
 Gabrielle Fontan 
 Marie-Louise Godard
 Jacky Blanchot 
 Germaine Michel
 Jean Clarieux 
 Charles Mahieu 
 Martial Rebe
 Emile Drain 
 Louise Fouquet
 Jeanne Véniat
 Yvonne Yma
 Henri Niel 
 Camille Guérini 
 Christian Fourcade
 René Hell
 Jean-François Bailly
 Roger Vieuille
 Jean Bertho
 Paul Violette
 Marcel Rouze
 Robert Fretel
 Maurice Derville
 Roland Lesaffre (scenes deleted)

References

External links

La Marie du port at Le Cinema Francais 

1950 films
French black-and-white films
1950 romantic drama films
Films based on Belgian novels
Films based on works by Georges Simenon
Films directed by Marcel Carné
French romantic drama films
Films scored by Joseph Kosma
1950s French films